Anna Wu may refer to:

Anna Wu (born 1951), Hong Kong political figure
Anna Wu (Chuck), a fictional character in the TV series Chuck

See also
Annie Wu (disambiguation)